The 2020–21 Arizona Wildcats men's basketball team represented the University of Arizona during the 2020–21 NCAA Division I men's basketball season. The team was led by 12th-year head coach Sean Miller, in his final season at the program, and played their home games at McKale Center in Tucson, Arizona as members of the Pac-12 Conference. The Wildcats finished the season 17–9, 11–9 in Pac–12 play to finish in fifth place.

The school self-imposed a postseason ban for the 2020–21 season amid an ongoing NCAA investigation over an FBI bribery scandal involving a former assistant coach and agent between 2017 and 2018 hoping to avoid further punishment from the NCAA. The ban included both the Pac–12 Tournament and the NCAA tournament. On April 7, 2021, the school fired head coach Sean Miller due to allegations related to the corruption scandal.

Previous season
The Wildcats finished the 2019–20 season 20–11, 10–8 in Pac-12 play to finish in tie for 5th place. They received the 5-seed in the 2020 Pac-12 tournament, where they defeated Washington in the first round and were set to take on USC in the quarterfinals before the remainder of the Pac-12 Tournament was cancelled amid the COVID-19 pandemic.

Offseason

2020 recruiting class
Dalen Terry, originally from Phoenix, Arizona, was the first commit of the 2020 recruiting class. He verbally committed to Arizona on July 23, 2019 over rival Arizona State, Arkansas, California, Colorado, Memphis, USC and Utah. Terry a consensus four-star prospect out of Hillcrest Prep in Phoenix, Arizona.

Bennedict Mathurin, originally from Montreal, Canada was the second commitment of the 2020 recruiting class. He verbally committed to Arizona on January 15, 2020 over Baylor & Washington State.  Mathurin a consensus four-star prospect out of the NBA Academy Latin America.

Kerr Kriisa, originally from Tartu, Estonia, was the third commitment of the 2020 recruiting class. He verbally committed to Arizona on April 18, 2020 over BYU, Oregon & Syracuse. Kriisa a consensus four-star prospect out of BC Prienai in Prienai, Lithuania.

Daniel Batcho, originally from Chatenay-Malabry, France, was the fourth commitment in the Arizona class. He committed to Arizona on April 23, 2020, over Arizona State, Creighton, Miami & Virginia Tech. He is a consensus four-star prospect out of Centre Fédéral de Basket-ball in Paris, France.

Tibet Gorener, originally from Şişli, Turkey, was the fifth commitment in the Arizona class.  He committed to Arizona on April 28, 2020, over Nebraska, Creighton, UC Santa Barbara & UConn. He is consensus four-star out of Orange Lutheran HS in Orange, California.

Ąžuolas Tubelis, originally from Lithuania, was the sixth commitment in the Arizona class. He committed to Arizona on May 27, 2020. He is currently a four-star prospect out of Rytas Vilnius in Lithuania.

Tautvilas Tubelis, originally from Lithuania, was the seventh commitment in the Arizona class. He committed to Arizona on May 27, 2020. He is currently an unranked prospect out of Rytas Vilnius in Lithuania.

2021 recruiting class  
Shane Nowell, originally from Sammamish, WA, was the third commit of the 2021 recruiting class.  He verbally committed to Arizona on October 31, 2020 over rival Montana, Montana State, Oklahoma & Washington. Nowell was a consensus four-star prospect out of Eastside Catholic in Sammamish, WA.

2022 recruiting class

Coaching changes
On April 3, 2020, Assistant coach Justin Gainey accepted the Associate Head coach position at Marquette.

On May 27, 2020, former Arizona great & NBA veteran Jason Terry was announced as an assistant coach on Miller's staff.

Personnel

Roster

 

Freshman forward Daniel Batcho had surgery on his right knee in late October and is out indefinitely. A timeline for his return to the court for the 2020-21 season will be reevaluated in late January.
Freshman guard Kerr Kriisa has been ruled ineligible by the NCAA until Feb. 4.
Jan. 11, 2021 - Jemarl Baker Jr. out for remainder of the season.

Coaching staff

Depth chart

Schedule and results
The Wildcats opponents are still being finalized in the summer and dates and times will be finalized in the fall. Arizona will host opponents Northern Arizona, Northern Colorado,
Cal State Bakersfield, Cal Baptist & Montana at McKale Center in Tucson, AZ. Arizona was forced to cancel the 2020 NIT Season Tip-Off in Brooklyn with Cincinnati, Texas Tech & St. John's because of the COVID-19 pandemic, as well as the Wildcats two true road against Gonzaga & Illinois.  The Pac-12 announced it would add two Pac-12 regular season games from the previous 18-game schedule, adding Colorado & Stanford.  The Pac-12 announced on August 11, 2020 that all fall sporting events would be canceled due to the COVID-19 pandemic.

|-
!colspan=12 style=| Regular season

|-

Rankings

*AP does not release post-NCAA Tournament rankings^Coaches did not release a Week 2 poll.

Player statistics

Awards & milestones

Season highs

Players 
Points: Jermal Baker Jr. – 33 (Northern Arizona)
Rebounds: Jordan Brown, Ąžuolas Tubelis (twice) – 15 (Grambling, USC, Washington)
Assists: James Akinjo (twice), Terrell Brown Jr. – 9 (Oregon State, Stanford)
Steals: Akinjo – 5 (Oregon State)
Blocks: Terrell Brown Jr., Christian Koloko (twice) – 4 (Northern Arizona, Cal State Bakersfield, Washington State)
Minutes: Akinjo – 44 (Washington State)

Team 
Points: 98 (Oregon State)
Field Goals: 35 (Oregon State)
Field Goal Attempts: 75 (Washington State)
3 Point Field Goals Made: 13 (Northern Arizona)
3 Point Field Goals Attempts: 28 (twice) (Cal State Bakersfield, Washington)
Free Throws Made: 32 (ASU)
Free Throws Attempts: 43 (ASU)
Rebounds: 58 (Washington)
Assists: 21(three) (Cal State Bakersfield, Northern Arizona, Oregon State)
Steals: 10 (ASU)
Blocked Shots: 10 (Northern Arizona)
Turnovers: 18 (Stanford)
Fouls: 29 (Washington State)

Weekly awards
 Jermal Baker Jr. (Dec. 14)
 Bennedict Mathurin (Jan. 4)
 Ąžuolas Tubelis (Feb. 22)
 Ąžuolas Tubelis (Mar. 1)

Pac-12 Conference honors
James Akinjo
All―Pac-12 First Team

Jordan Brown
Pac-12 6th Man of the Year

Bennedict Mathurin
All―Pac-12 Freshman First Team

Ąžuolas Tubelis
All―Pac-12 Freshman First Team
All―Pac-12 Honorable Mention

See also
2020–21 Arizona Wildcats women's basketball team

References

2020-21
2020–21 Pac-12 Conference men's basketball season
2020 in sports in Arizona
2021 in sports in Arizona